Wilhelm-Diess-Gymnasium (WDG) is a gymnasium (senior high school/sixth form college) in Pocking, Bavaria, Germany.

In 2015 accommodations for 200 Syrian refugees from the 2015 crisis were established adjacent to the school's gymnasium (athletic facility). Athletic classes were relocated to a primary school. In addition the headmaster asked female students to not wear short skirts, short shorts, and revealing blouses. Some of the school's parents reacted negatively to the clothing suggestion and the suggestion was discussed in the media.

References

External links
 Wilhelm-Diess-Gymnasium 
  Rometta, Tanja. "Rechte nutzen Elternbrief von Pockinger Schule für Ausländerhetze." Passauer Neue Presse. 25 June 2015.

Gymnasiums in Germany
Passau (district)
Schools in Bavaria